is a 2003 Japanese horror film directed by Takashi Miike. The film is based on the novel Chakushin Ari by Yasushi Akimoto. The plot revolves around Yumi Nakamura, a young psychology student whose friend Yoko gets a strange voice message on her cell phone. The message is dated two days in the future and Yoko can hear herself screaming in it. After Yoko mysteriously dies, her death sets off a chain of events which leads Yumi to discover that this phenomenon has been occurring throughout Japan long before Yoko received an alarming call from her future self. When Yumi receives a call with the date and time of her death, she struggles to save herself and learn the truth behind the calls.

The film received a critically panned English-language adaptation in 2008.

Plot
While out at a pub with friends, Yoko Okazaki misses a call on her cellphone, but the caller ID says it's from herself. She and her friend Yumi Nakamura listen to Yoko's voice message, dated two days into the future, where she says it's starting to rain, followed by a horrendous scream. Two days later, Yumi receives a call from Yoko and realizes that Yoko is on the same routine as the voicemail. Yoko screams as she is violently thrown off an overpass onto a speeding train; her severed hand is seen dialing a number. Although authorities assume suicide, her schoolmates recall similar deaths that were preceded by voicemails. Yoko's boyfriend Kenji Kawai tells Yumi he got a voicemail from himself dated two days after. Kenji is pulled down an elevator shaft unexplainably and a red jawbreaker candy falls out of his mouth as his phone dials another number by itself.

A nervous Yumi invites her friend Natsumi Konishi to stay with her. Yumi turns both of their cell phones off, but Natsumi still receives a call from her own number. Rather than a voicemail, she is messaged a photo of her with a shadowy figure behind her. At their university, the media picks up on the story and offers Natsumi a chance to be exorcised on live TV. Despite Yumi's protests, Natsumi anxiously agrees.

Yumi meets Hiroshi Yamashita, a detective who has been investigating the curse that also claimed his sister Ritsuko. Yamashita shares that the next victim is called one minute after the previous death, and that the victims have red jawbreakers in their mouths. Their investigation leads them to a hospital which has since changed its building and number. Yumi recognizes a sound she heard before Kenji's death: a spritz from an asthma inhaler. They trace the autopsy records to a girl named Mimiko Mizunuma who had died from an asthma attack, with her mother Marie going missing. Ritsuko's journal shows that whenever Mimiko had an attack, her sister Nanako would suffer some injury at the same time. They suspect Munchausen syndrome by proxy, where a parent purposely makes a child sick so she can take care of her and be praised for it. 

The night of Natsumi's exorcism goes horribly wrong. As Yumi and Yamashita arrive, Natsumi is violently killed. A jawbreaker drops out of her mouth and Yumi gets the cursed voicemail next. When Yamashita escorts her home and encourages her to stay with her family, she reveals to Yamashita that her mother abused her as a child.

At an orphanage, Yamashita meets Nanako, who is unable to talk, but has a teddy bear that plays the same song as the ringtone. Yumi travels to the abandoned hospital alone and is haunted by the spirit of Mimiko. Her cell messages her that she will die in one minute. Unable to reach Yumi, Yamashita races to the hospital and finds an arm clutching an active cellphone; he stops its call. After the minute elapses, Yamashita uncovers a crate holding Marie's body. It comes to life and Yumi sees her own abusive mother in Marie. She tearfully embraces her, apologizing for leaving, and Marie's body returns to a corpse.

Yumi goes home and Yamashita is called back to the police station. The Mizunuma videotape that Yamashita found reveals that Marie did not abuse her children; instead, Mimiko abused her sister. The tape shows her cutting Nanako, then suffering an asthma attack. Marie found out the truth and rushed Nanako to the hospital, leaving Mimiko to die. Nanako tells Yamashita that she would get a candy from Mimiko if she stayed silent. Yumi is haunted by Mimiko in her home, playing out the same events her voicemail showed. When Yamashita arrives, he finds Yumi in an apparently normal state. When he embraces her, he is stabbed and sees Yumi appearing as Mimiko in the mirror. After a dream where he helps the dying Mimiko with an inhaler, he wakes in a hospital where a possessed Yumi feeds him a candy with her mouth and smiles, revealing that Mimiko has found "a new Nanako" in Yamashita to care for.

Cast

Release
One Missed Call premiered at the Tokyo International Film Festival on November 3, 2003. Its English title was listed as You've Got a Call at the festival. It was later released theatrically in Japan on January 17, 2004, where it was distributed by Toho. In the Philippines, it was released by Buena Vista International on December 8 the same year. It was released by Media Blasters in the United States with English subtitles on April 22, 2005.

In February 2020, Arrow Films released One Missed Call on Blu-ray in the United Kingdom, the United States and Canada.

Critical reception
Rotten Tomatoes reports a score of 44%, with an average rating of 5.2 out of 10, based on 27 reviews from critics. The website's "Critics Consensus" said the film "has a few interesting ideas and benefits from director Takashi Miike's eye, but is ultimately too unoriginal to recommend".

Entertainment Weekly wrote, "One Missed Call is so unoriginal that the movie could almost be a parody of J-horror tropes", yet "Miike, for a while at least, stages it with a dread-soaked visual flair that allows you to enjoy being manipulated". Dana Stevens of The New York Times mentions that "[the film] staggers under the weight of its director's taste for baroque excess".

According to Nick Schager of Slant Magazine, the film is "[a] mainstream J-horror flick that dutifully regurgitates the apparitions, aesthetic, and themes of its genre predecessors".

Sequels
The film was followed up with the sequel One Missed Call 2 which was released in 2005. One Missed Call, a ten-episode Japanese television drama was broadcast in 2005. One Missed Call: Final was released in Japan on 24 June 2006.

Remake
The film was remade in English as One Missed Call, released in 2008.

References

Sources

External links
 
  
  One Missed Call at the Japanese Movie Database

2003 films
One Missed Call
2000s ghost films
2003 horror films
Fiction about curses
Films about child abuse
Films about mobile phones
Films based on horror novels
Films directed by Takashi Miike
Japan in fiction
Japanese horror films
Japanese supernatural horror films
Kadokawa Dwango franchises
Techno-horror films
Tokyo Shock
2000s Japanese films